Conus fulmen, common name the thunderbolt cone, is a species of sea snail, a marine gastropod mollusk in the family Conidae, the cone snails and their allies.

Like all species within the genus Conus, these snails are predatory and venomous. They are capable of "stinging" humans, therefore live ones should be handled carefully or not at all.

Description
The size of an adult shell varies from 45 mm and 80 mm.

The shell is somewhat elongately ovate, smooth and slightly grooved towards the base. The color of the shell is pale rose-purple, white round the middle ;
longitudinally marked with two or three very prominent, broad, waved, purple-brown streaks. The spire is obtusely convex, variegated
with purple-brown. The apex is rose-tinted.

Distribution
This marine species occurs off Vietnam and South Japan to the Ryukyus

References

 Filmer R.M. (2001). A Catalogue of Nomenclature and Taxonomy in the Living Conidae 1758 - 1998. Backhuys Publishers, Leiden. 388pp.
 Tucker J.K. (2009). Recent cone species database. 4 September 2009 Edition
 Tucker J.K. & Tenorio M.J. (2009) Systematic classification of Recent and fossil conoidean gastropods. Hackenheim: Conchbooks. 296 pp.
  Petit, R. E. (2009). George Brettingham Sowerby, I, II & III: their conchological publications and molluscan taxa. Zootaxa. 2189: 1–218
  Puillandre N., Duda T.F., Meyer C., Olivera B.M. & Bouchet P. (2015). One, four or 100 genera? A new classification of the cone snails. Journal of Molluscan Studies. 81: 1–23

Gallery

External links
 The Conus Biodiversity website
 
Cone Shells – Knights of the Sea

fulmen
Gastropods described in 1843